Henry Augustus Brudenell-Bruce, 5th Marquess of Ailesbury (11 April 1842 – 10 March 1911), styled Lord Henry Bruce from 1878 to 1894, was a British soldier, businessman and Conservative politician.

Early life
Ailesbury was the third son of Ernest Brudenell-Bruce, 3rd Marquess of Ailesbury, and his wife the Hon. Louisa Elizabeth, daughter of John Horsley-Beresford, 2nd Baron Decies. He was educated at Windlesham House School and Eton College.

Career 
He served in the British Army and achieved the rank of captain in the 9th Regiment of Foot and lieutenant colonel in the 3rd Battalion of the Duke of Edinburgh's Wiltshire Regiment. Between 1886 and 1892 he sat as Member of Parliament for Chippenham. He was also chairman of Meux & Co, brewers. In 1894 he succeeded to the marquessate on the early death of his nephew and took his seat in the House of Lords.

Family 
Lord Ailesbury married, in 1870, Georgiana Sophia Maria Pinckney, daughter of George Henry Pinckney, of Tawstock, Devon. She died in London on 23 June 1902. They had three children, Lady Ernestine Mary Alma Georgiana (6 September 1871 – 18 May 1953), George William James Chandos Brudenell-Bruce, 6th Marquess of Ailesbury (21 May 1873 – 4 August 1961), and Lady Violet Louisa Marjory (1 March 1880 – 26 August 1923). Lady Marjory married James Binney of Pampisford Hall, Cambridgeshire and had three children, Merlin Brudenell Binney(1908), Olivia Rowena Binney(1910) and Hector Danneskiold Brudenell Binney(1919). Ailesbury remained a widower until his death in March 1911, aged 68. He was succeeded in the marquessate by his son George.

Notes

References 
 Kidd, Charles, Williamson, David (editors). Debrett's Peerage and Baronetage (1990 edition). New York: St Martin's Press, 1990,

External links 
 

1842 births
1911 deaths
Brudenell Bruce, Henry, Lord
Brudenell Bruce, Henry, Lord
Ailesbury, M5
Royal Norfolk Regiment officers
Wiltshire Regiment officers
Henry
Earls of Cardigan
5
People educated at Windlesham House School